Photomechanical effect is the change in the shape of a material when it is exposed to light. This effect was first documented by Alexander Graham Bell in 1880. More recently, Kenji Uchino demonstrated that a photostrictive material could be used for legs in the construction of a miniature optically-powered "walker".

The most common mechanism of photomechanical effect is light-induced heating.

Photomechanical materials may be considered smart materials due to their natural change implemented by external factors.

See also 
 Smart materials

References

External links 
 The Nonlinear Optics Web Site

Mechanics
Materials science